Events from the year 1687 in France

Incumbents
 Monarch – Louis XIV

Events
March – Embassy of Loubère-Céberet to Siam, consisting of a French expeditionary force of 1,361 soldiers, missionaries, envoys and crews aboard five warships.
Fort Denonville established

Births

15 February – Philippe Charles de La Fare, a Marshal of France (d. 1752)
8 May – Jean Henri Desmercières, French-Danish merchant, banker and landowner (d. 1778)

Deaths
18 March – François Collignon, engraver, print-seller and publisher (born c.1609)
19 March – René-Robert Cavelier, Sieur de La Salle, explorer (b. 1643)

Full date missing 
Charles de Grimaldi-Régusse, aristocrat, landowner and politician (b. 1612)

References

1680s in France